Nigel Allan Havers (born 6 November 1951) is an English actor and presenter. His film roles include Lord Andrew Lindsay in the 1981 British film Chariots of Fire, which earned him a BAFTA nomination; as Dr. Rawlins in the 1987 Steven Spielberg war drama, Empire of the Sun; and as Ronny in the 1984 David Lean epic A Passage to India. Television roles include Tom Latimer in the British TV comedy series Don't Wait Up and Lewis Archer in Coronation Street, between 2009 and 2019.

Early life and family
Havers was born in Edmonton, Middlesex, and is the younger of two boys (with an older brother, Philip), born of Sir Michael Havers (later Lord Havers), who was a barrister who became a controversial Attorney General for England and Wales and, briefly, Lord Chancellor in the Conservative Government in the 1980s. His paternal aunt, Lady Butler-Sloss, his grandfather Sir Cecil Havers and elder brother Philip Havers KC also had prominent legal careers. His paternal uncle, David Havers, was a Manchester-based businessman.

Havers took part in the BBC TV series Who Do You Think You Are?, broadcast in the UK in July 2013. As part of the show he explored his ancestry from an Essex businessman, on his father's side, and a Cornish miller on his mother's side.

Education
Havers was educated at Nowton Court Prep School in Bury St Edmunds, Suffolk and the Arts Educational School, an independent school in London, opting against the Eton education traditional to his family (except his father, who was educated at Westminster School), because he thought that fagging "sounded frightful".

Professional life and career
Havers is most known for "playing the quintessential, old school Englishman with his dashing good looks, cut-glass accent and thoroughly charming manner". Havers's first acting job was in the radio series Mrs Dale's Diary and he subsequently went on to working for the Prospect Theatre Company initially "carrying a spear and making cups of tea" as he puts it in his autobiography. After this he had a stint working for a Jamie Symonds. Symonds, who was interviewed on Richard and Judy, stated "Nige used to babysit for us back then as well as iron and generally fix things. I loved him greatly as I still do. I miss his fluffy hair and his strong hands".

From an early age Havers had an eye for the ladies; Kenneth More, a friend of his father, advised a young Havers that "If you are charming, you don't have to ask them to go to bed, they ask you". He describes his experiences with an early leading lady, Maxine Audley thus: "I was in her dressing room doing whatever she asked me to, and I mean anything and everything. One afternoon I sauntered into her dressing room, still in my officer's kit, only to find a similarly clad new member of the cast rehearsing what I had perfected over the past few months. My time was up. She blew me a kiss and I slid away. Actually, I was rather relieved, I needed a rest."

After his theatre work, Havers slid into a period of acting unemployment, during which time he worked for a wine merchant. He ended this part of his career when his girlfriend, who later became his first wife, Carolyn Cox, suggested they move in together in 1974.

In 1975, Havers's career began to pick up with an appearance in Upstairs, Downstairs, appearing in one of the series' last episodes, "Joke Over" as Peter Dinmont, one of Georgina's (Lesley-Anne Down) Roaring Twenties "party" friends. Dinmont is in the Rolls-Royce when Georgina accidentally kills a farmer on a bicycle. Dinmont refuses to testify on Georgina's behalf at a preliminary trial, as he was passed out drunk in the back seat and did not witness the accident.

It was also in 1975 that Havers appeared in the Granada Television daytime series Crown Court, in which he played a  hapless heroin addict, Patrick Mills, who stands trial on a series of drug offences.

His first film appearance was a small part in Pope Joan (1972) and he was a character in The Glittering Prizes (1976), but his first major success came with the leading role in a BBC dramatisation of Nicholas Nickleby (1977), closely followed by another BBC drama serial, A Horseman Riding By (1978). By the time he appeared in the film Chariots of Fire (1981), he had become a familiar face on British television. Despite his work in such films as A Passage to India (1984), Empire of the Sun (1987) and Farewell to the King (1989), he never became a film star, but has continued in a succession of starring roles on television. He co-starred for several years in the 1980s BBC sitcom Don't Wait Up (1983–1990) alongside Dinah Sheridan and Tony Britton. He also starred in The Little Princess (1986) with Maureen Lipman, which won him a dedicated audience. He is also widely recognised in the Lloyds Bank television commercials.

Havers co-starred with Warren Clarke in the 1991 comedic mini-series Sleepers on the BBC.  In it, he and Clarke played former KGB spies who had assimilated into English life in the 1960s and were "lost" for 25 years.  Successfully and happily living as Englishmen, their worlds are turned upside-down when they discover that the KGB is looking for them.  As they resist going back to Russia, the ex-spies lead the KGB, CIA, and MI5 on a madcap chase through England.  

Havers appeared on This Is Your Life in 1992, having been surprised by host Michael Aspel at Twickenham Film Studios. He later wrote an autobiography, titled Playing with Fire, which was published in October 2006 by Headline Publishing Group.

In 2009, Havers appeared in the U.S. television drama Brothers & Sisters, and the Doctor Who spin-off The Sarah Jane Adventures. On 18 December 2009, he first appeared in the British soap (broadcast on the ITV network) Coronation Street playing the charming escort Lewis Archer, who woos Audrey Roberts. He left on 13 August 2010. He returned to the role on 17 February 2012 and left again on 1 February 2013. He returned again on 1 June 2018 and remained in Coronation Street until the character's death on 1 January 2019.

In November 2010, Havers became a contestant on the tenth series of I'm A Celebrity... Get Me Out of Here!, which started on 14 November 2010. On 21 November, Havers left the show after vehemently objecting to a challenge called Kangaroo Court in which contestants who lost the challenge would be subjected to an electric shock.

As a guest star in the 2011 Christmas Special episode of television show Downton Abbey, Havers portrayed Lord Hepworth, a charming and hopeful suitor of wealthy Lady Rosamund Painswick, the widowed sister of the Earl of Grantham played by Samantha Bond.  In the episode, Hepworth is discovered having an affair with Lady Rosamund's maid and outed as a "fortune hunter." Series creator Julian Fellowes remarked in his book of teleplays for the second series of Downton Abbey that "no one in Equity is better" than Havers "at playing a cad."

In July 2012, Havers presented a programme on ITV called The Real Chariots of Fire, a documentary about the runners who inspired the film Chariots of Fire.  In 2014, he played Tony Pebble in The Life of Rock with Brian Pern, a BBC Four comedy which parodied the life and career of former Genesis singer, Peter Gabriel.  On 25 January 2015, Havers took part in celebrity talent show Get Your Act Together.

Havers appeared in the ninth series of the sitcom Benidorm, in 2017, returning as the same character for the tenth series in 2018. He also joined fellow celebrities Simon Callow, Lorraine Chase, and Debbie McGee on the Channel 5 (UK) show, Celebrity Carry On Barging,  later that year.

Personal life

In the mid-1980s, Havers began an affair with Polly Williams, the daughter of actor Hugh Williams and the sister of his friend, the actor Simon Williams. He has stated that he had several affairs during his first marriage, which he now regrets.  Havers has written of the depression he experienced trying to choose between his marriage to Carolyn Cox and their young daughter Kate, born in 1977, and his mistress. During this time, he consulted a psychiatrist at the Devonshire Hospital in London. Things were resolved in his mind when he took on a role in the TV film, Naked Under Capricorn, which was filmed in Alice Springs, Australia. He describes in his autobiography wrangling a herd of cattle and catching sight in the distance of a figure who turned out to be Williams. The couple got married in 1989, and the marriage lasted until her death on 24 June 2004. A blessing was held in Saint Tropez the following month.  Following his wife's death, Havers took legal action, claiming her will left him without "reasonable financial provision".  The case was settled before court; Havers was awarded £375,000 and proceeds from the sale of some of his late wife's belongings.

Havers was arrested in February 1990 on suspicion of drunk driving, and taken to Harrow police station.  He was later banned from driving for one year, and fined £500, but told a woman's magazine "I don't regret it at all".  He continued, "I thought the whole thing was pretty unfair.  I was only 300 yards from home in a restaurant and had only used my car anyway because it was pouring with rain."  He said "I got the same punishment as people who are three times over the limit.  I felt victimised, especially as the police know who I am."  He was criticised for these comments by John Knight, co-founder of the Campaign against Drinking and Driving, while a spokesman for the Association of Chief Police Officers said "I think he's probably a little bit out of touch with public feeling."

On 8 June 2007, Havers married  Essex native Georgiana "George" Bronfman (née Rita Webb), in New York City. Bronfman is the former spouse of the late Edgar Bronfman, the mother of Sarah and Clare Bronfman, and is known for her charitable work with noted palaeoanthropologist Richard Leakey.

He is the godfather of comedian Jack Whitehall.

Filmography

Film

Television

Theatre (pantomime)
 Jack and the Beanstalk - London Palladium (2022)
 ‘’ Pantoland’’ - London Palladium (2021)
 Goldilocks and the Three Bears – London Palladium (2019)
 Snow White – London Palladium (2018)
 Dick Whittington – London Palladium (2017)Jack and the Beanstalk - Theatre Royal Bath (2016)
 The Importance Of Being Earnest – Theatre Royal, Glasgow (2015)
 Dick Whittington – Swindon Wyvern Theatre (2014)
 The Importance Of Being Earnest – Harold Pinter Theatre (2014)
 Robin Hood – Theatre Royal, Plymouth (2013)
 Jack and the Beanstalk – The Mayflower (2012)
 Peter Pan – Hawth Theatre (2011)
 Dick Whittington – Birmingham Hippodrome (2010–2011)
 Jack and the Beanstalk – Nottingham Theatre Royal (2009)
 Aladdin – Yvonne Arnaud Theatre (2008)
 Cinderella – Richmond Theatre (2007)

Theatre (other)
 Private Lives (2021-22) as lead actor
 Art (2018) as lead actor
 Rebecca (2011) as lead actor
 Ricochet (1993) as producer and lead actor

Radio
 Proof by Dick Francis (1987) as Tony Beach
 Reluctant Persuaders (2015) as Rupert Hardacre

Audio books
 The Scarifyers: The Secret Weapon of Doom (2010) as Victor Bright
 Doctor Who: No More Lies (2007) as Nick
 Tales from Watership Down'' (Richard Adams) (1996)

References

External links
 
 The Nigel Havers Alliance – A mock political party
 Profile on the Red Cross site

1951 births
20th-century English male actors
21st-century English male actors
Living people
English male film actors
English male soap opera actors
English male stage actors
Nigel
I'm a Celebrity...Get Me Out of Here! (British TV series) participants
Male actors from London
People educated at the Arts Educational Schools
People from Edmonton, London
Sons of life peers